Pluto TV is a free ad-supported streaming television (FAST) service  owned and operated by the Paramount Streaming division of Paramount Global.

Co-founded by Tom Ryan, Ilya Pozin and Nick Grouf in 2013 and based in Los Angeles, California, in the United States, and parts of the rest of the Americas, and Europe, it carries advertising-supported video-on-demand (AVOD) content, as well as linear, internet television channels. The service's revenue is generated from video advertisements seen during programming within commercial breaks structured similarly to those found on conventional television.

Pluto TV licenses its content directly from providers; as of March 2020, it had deals with 170 content partners providing more than 250 channels and 100,000 unique hours worth of programming. Its content is available via its website and mobile apps on Android and iOS operating systems. In January 2022, the service reached a total of 64 million monthly active users. In April 2022, Pluto TV reached 68 million monthly active users. In July 2022, Pluto TV reached 69.9 million monthly active users. As of January 2023, Pluto TV has a total of 79 million monthly active users.

History

First years (2014–2019)
Pluto TV launched its beta website on March 31, 2014. Co-founded by Thomas V. Ryan (former Senior Vice President of Digital Strategy at EMI and co-founder of now-defunct digital music retailer CDuctive), Ilya Pozin (founder and former CEO of venture builder firm Coplex) and Nick Grouf (co-founder and managing director of venture capital firm Alpha Edison), it was originally developed to provide curated channels of existing online content, offering a slate of nearly 100 categorized channels featuring content aggregated from several video-sharing platforms (including YouTube, Vimeo, and Dailymotion) as well as additional content provided through partnerships with original web content services and television networks (including Funny or Die, QVC, Refinery29, RocketJump and TYT Network). The service was originally owned by Pluto Inc., which, during the second half of 2013 and early 2014, had raised $13 million in series A funding from investors that included Universal Music Group, Sky plc, UTA Ventures, and venture capital firms U.S. Venture Partners (USVP), QueensBridge Venture Partners, Pritzker Group Venture Capital, Luminari Capital, Great Oaks Venture Capital and Chicago Ventures. On May 14, 2014, Pluto unveiled a digital video recorder feature on its website known as "myPluto"; users could “record” content by clicking a “save show” button that would archive content from the channel as it played.

On July 1, 2015, Pluto TV announced that it had signed a deal with Disney's now-owned Hulu to distribute the ad-supported video content, available for free on Hulu's website at the time, including current-season episodes of programs from ABC, NBC and Fox, recent and older classic television series, and domestic and foreign animated programs. Under the arrangement, Hulu handled advertising for content made available through the Pluto website. Separately, in the weeks preceding the Hulu deal, Pluto TV had reached content agreements with AOL, Endemol Beyond USA, Shout! Factory, Jukin Media and YouTube content channels Devin SuperTramp, Multicom, Around the World in 4K and Amazing Places on Our Planet to distribute their programming on the service. In October 2015, 20 additional channels (featuring content from AwesomenessTV, IGN, Cracked, DHX Media, Just For Laughs, Newsy, Legendary Digital Networks and The Onion) were brought onto the service's lineup, bringing the total number of curated channels offered by Pluto to around 120.

On May 15, 2016, Pluto TV signed an agreement with Sony to make the Pluto TV app available on the PlayStation Store for download by users of the PlayStation 3 and PlayStation 4. In 2016, Pluto Inc. raised $30 million in series B venture capital funding from ProSiebenSat.1 Media, Scripps Networks Interactive, and venture capital firms Luminari Capital, Chicago Ventures and Third Wave Ventures, valuing the company at $140 million. The round was led by German television network ProSieben, with additional funding from telecommunications company Sky UK. On April 30, 2017, Pluto Inc. added a chief programming officer role, appointing Robert Magdlen—who formerly served as senior vice president of program strategy and acquisitions for the Universal-owned E! and as a production executive for TNT—in the post, handling responsibilities for programming and channel development from the company's Los Angeles headquarters.

On May 15, 2017, Pluto TV launched a traditional video-on-demand offering, contisting a large library of movies and television series licensed from such distributors as Metro-Goldwyn-Mayer, Viacom, Sony Pictures, Fremantle, Monstercat, King Features Syndicate alongside two Canadian studios, DHX Media and Nelvana that are made available for individual viewing to Pluto users. Variety reported that , the service was averaging 6 million users per month, and, it was rated one of the most-watched Roku Channels on Roku.

By October 2017, Pluto TV reached over 15 million users. On October 17 of that year, Pluto TV announced that it received a $5-million investment from Samsung Venture Investment Corporation as part of an $8.3 million round of funding raised by various investors. On March 15, 2018, Pluto TV entered into a partnership with SpotX to provide advertising monetization services for Pluto, including engendering sales from media buyers breaking into over-the-top content services. On August 1, 2018, Vizio launched a new ad-supported streaming platform powered by Pluto TV, called WatchFree. This service is built into several models of Vizio's line of Internet-connected smart TVs, particularly those supporting its SmartCast operating system, and is advertised as having "an easy-to-navigate, cable-like interface".

On October 1, 2018, Pluto TV expanded into parts of Europe, with the launch of a platform on Sky's Now TV service in the United Kingdom, offering an initial slate of more than 12 curated channels. Also in October 2018, Pluto TV picked Tru Optik to help with advertising inventory. On December 4, 2018, Pluto TV launched a regional service in Germany and Austria, also through a separate collaborative agreement with Sky, with the app's content made available initially via the Sky TV stick; the German/Austrian service initially incorporated a slate of 15 streaming channels (consisted of both Pluto-exclusive services with German and English language content as well as channels compiled by third-party content providers).

Purchase by Viacom/Paramount Global ownership (2019–present)
On January 22, 2019, Viacom announced its intention to acquire Pluto for $340 million. Viacom's plans for Pluto TV included using the service as a marketing tool for its portfolio of linear media brands (including incorporating more licensed content from Viacom-owned properties) and to serve as a distribution outlet for its in-house digital content brands (including CBS News Streaming, AwesomenessTV and CNET), expanding the service into Latin America and expanding its distribution on smart TVs. The company also planned to use the service to upsell its subscription video-on-demand (SVOD) properties (including Paramount+, Showtime, Noggin, and BET+) directly to consumers. The deal was completed on March 4, 2019. On March 18, 2019, Viacom—through its Viacom International Media Networks (VIMN) unit—announced plans to launch Pluto TV worldwide; VIMN President James Currell stated that the company believed the global SVOD sector was "becoming too crowded and capital intensive," choosing to focus on building scale through ad-supported streaming platforms.

On May 1, 2019, Pluto introduced branded channels based on Viacom Media Networks-owned cable outlets and other Viacom properties, including content from Paramount Pictures, Nickelodeon, BET, Comedy Central, VH1, Logo, TV Land and MTV. Among those channels is a revival of Spike, which had been relaunched as Paramount Network in a year later. The free channels are not simulcasts of their namesake networks, as contractual restrictions with traditional pay television providers prevent it from distributing the full linear feeds, but instead focus primarily on archival content and series that Pluto TV has acquired from other content providers. Some of these branded services are direct offshoots of their linear counterparts, while others (such as CMT Cheer 24/7, TV Land Sitcoms, TV Land Drama, MTV Teen, VH1: I Love Reality, and Nickelodeon offshoots Dora TV and Totally Turtles, but added with NickMovies and NickGames, a 24/7 revival of the former channel that shut down for eight years in December 31.) maintain theme formats offering specialty programming owned by ViacomCBS and other program library partners.

On June 13, 2019, Pluto TV was launched on Comcast's Xfinity X1 cable boxes. On July 1, 2019, the service launched a Spanish-language programming tier, Pluto TV Latino, consisting initially of eleven Spanish and Portuguese-language channels (including two sports-focused channels, Lucha Libre and Combate World, that were previously assigned to the service's main sports tier) that incorporate programming originally produced natively in those languages and Spanish-dubbed versions of English and Portuguese programs.

On August 13, 2019, National Amusements announced that Viacom and CBS Corporation—which had split into two separate companies in 2005, five years after the original Viacom first acquired CBS's assets—would recombine their assets into a singular entity to be named ViacomCBS in a deal valued at up to $15.4 billion. Following the announcement, Deadline Hollywood, citing sources within the company, identified Pluto TV as a potential outlet for CBS streaming content. Pluto had recently carried CBS News's CBSN, and technology and video-game-oriented CNET Video. Additional channels from CBS, including the CBS News New York and Los Angeles services, and an Entertainment Tonight-branded entertainment news channel (ET Live), were added to the service on November 13, 2019, prior to the completion of the merger.

In September 2019, Pluto TV became available on mobile platforms in Germany, Austria, Switzerland and the United Kingdom; the service first became available in those countries on iOS and Apple TV devices on September 6, and on Android devices on September 24. By November 2019, the service was estimated to have 20 million monthly active users.

On February 3, 2020, ViacomCBS announced that Pluto TV would launch in Latin America at the end of March, offering 17 channels available in two languages, Spanish and Portuguese at launch; additional channels would be added on a monthly basis with more than 80 channels expected to be available by the end of 2020. Alongside content carried by ViacomCBS Networks International-owned local versions of its corporate parent's U.S. media properties, co-owned Argentine network Telefe and Porta dos Fundos would also provide content for the service. The service was expected to launch in Brazil in December 2020, but was anticipated and was launched on November 17, 2020.

In January 2020, Pluto TV unveiled a new logo at CES 2020, and later unveiled a redesign of its Apple iOS apps, which included a new channel guide and on-demand menu interface. The redesigned interface—absent the new logo—was rolled out to the website and desktop app the following day on February 21, its Roku app on February 26, and Android devices and other platforms on March 2.

On February 20, 2020, ViacomCBS estimated that Pluto TV generated a monthly average of 22 million viewers in the fourth quarter of 2019, with expectations of its user base reaching 30 million monthly viewers by December 2020. The company also announced that Pluto content would be incorporated into a revamped version of CBS All Access, which would also add content from ViacomCBS Domestic Media Networks cable properties, Paramount Pictures and CBS Television Distribution. ViacomCBS CEO Bob Bakish stated that Pluto TV—which will remain a free, standalone offering—would be part of the company's refocusing on three core streaming services, alongside the subscription-based CBS All Access and Showtime's OTT service, which would act as its mid-level and premium offerings and which Pluto will also be used to upsell along with ViacomCBS's other niche streaming platforms.

On July 9, 2020, the service launched an app for Virgin Media customers in the United Kingdom.

On October 8, 2020, ViacomCBS announced Pluto TV's launch in Spain, Italy and France, with 40 channels and thousands of hours of on-demand content.

On July 17, 2021, Pluto TV added several new channels including News 12 New York, Pluto TV Home, and Professional Bull Riders’ RidePass. A deal made between Pluto TV and PBR allowed for Pluto TV to be the exclusive home to RidePass content.

On September 29, 2021, Pluto TV's parent ViacomCBS agreed to pay $3.5 million and enter into a consent decree with the FCC to provide clear and accessible closed captioning, which would often not be passed down to the consumer via Pluto TV apps or websites despite either being part of a program already or being captioned by the live programming provider. The FCC's determined the service had not implemented proper and visible settings to allow the passthrough of captions, removed captioning capabilities, and did not maintain email or telephone captioning support hotlines required by the FCC to address viewer complaints. Under FCC rules, all nonexempt full-length video programming delivered over the Internet must present closed captions if originally aired over American television with captioning, if the programming had previously been shown on television in the U.S. with captions. This effectively applies to most television programming created after 1984, along with the 1990 Television Decoder Circuitry Act of 1990, which mandated a requirement for captions to be accessible on all but the smallest televisions.

On November 29, 2021, ViacomCBS announced that Pluto TV would launch in Sweden, Norway and Denmark by 2022 as part of a joint venture with Nordic Entertainment Group, phasing out the company's existing AVOD service Viafree upon launch. On March 16, 2022, it was announced that the launch date of Pluto TV in the three countries will be on May 18, 2022.

On February 16, 2022,  Pluto TV's parent company, ViacomCBS Streaming, was renamed to Paramount Streaming, in-line with the rebranding of parent company ViacomCBS to Paramount Global.

On May 18, 2022, Pluto TV was launched in the Nordics through a partnership with Viaplay Group (formerly called Nordic Entertainment Group). On July 13, 2022, Pluto TV added five new channel categories: Game Shows, Daytime TV, Home, Food, and Lifestyle & Culture, and two new channels: Let's Make a Deal and The Judge Judy Channel. Additional channels devoted to Jeopardy! and Wheel of Fortune were added in August 2022.

On September 1, 2022, Pluto TV launched two new channels, the movie channel 00s Replay, and The Ed Sullivan Show. More channels were added throughout the month: CSI: Miami and its spin-off CSI: NY, launched on September 13, 60 Minutes launched on September 24, and Hallmark Movies & More and Rachael Ray launched on September 26. On October 31, 2022, Pluto TV announced that it would add 6,300 episodes of classic CBS-distributed series to its on-demand library by the end of 2022, including Cheers, Criminal Minds, Frasier, and Star Trek.

On December 1, 2022, Pluto TV launched in Canada in partnership with Corus Entertainment, which is handling marketing and Canadian advertising sales, and contributing content from its networks and Global News. The next day, the service added additional Christmas-related channels for the holiday season, as well as More Star Trek, Confess by Nosey, and AMC en Español. On December 15, 2022, Pluto TV launched a new advertising campaign featuring actress Drew Barrymore.

Programming 
Pluto TV is structured similarly to the traditional cable television model, offering its content as designated channels categorized by program content type into multiple channel categories:
 Featured – new channels and special event content.
 Movies – movie channels, consisting of both general-format and genre-based (e.g., comedy, action, horror) services.
 Entertainment – varied general, drama and specialty entertainment-based programming.
 News + Opinion – mainstream news and opinion channels, as well as partisan, commentary-based outlets reflecting progressive and conservative viewpoints.
 Crime – crime-based programming, primarily dramas.
 Reality – reality and competition shows.
 Game Shows (introduced in July 2022)
 Daytime TV (introduced in July 2022)
 Comedy – comedy-based services, consisting of stand-up, sitcom/sketch comedy, and curated viral video channels (e.g. Mystery Science Theater 3000).
 Classic TV – channels focused on classic television shows and cartoons, mostly comedies.
 Home (formerly Home + DIY, renamed in July 2022) – lifestyle-oriented channels.
 Food (formerly part of Home + DIY, introduced in July 2022)
 Lifestyle + Culture (formerly Explore, renamed in July 2022)
 Sports – live and previously aired events, sporting news and analysis programs.
 Gaming + Anime – Japanese animation, technology, sci-fi, and geek culture-oriented channels.
 Music – music videos (with Vevo and MTV) and video concerts (audio-based music channels from Dash Radio were previously among the selections, but they were dropped in July 2020).
 En Español – Spanish-language channels.
 Kids – channels aimed at children and young teenagers.
 Local –  CBS News Local channels (which had previously been carried in the news section via geolocation), News 12 New York and geolocated channels from Cox Media Group stations.
Former channel categories:

Explore – travel, lifestyle, historical, science and special-interest channels.

As of August 2022, Pluto TV carries over 200 channels, packaging content acquired through various content syndication deals, as well as programming from ViacomCBS's internal libraries. Traditional television channels whose feeds are carried directly on Pluto include WeatherNation TV, Newsmax TV, Dabl, Bloomberg Television, Sky News, CNN, Professional Bull Riders’ RidePass, Eleven Sports (albeit with some events replaced with alternative programming due to streaming rights restrictions), Stadium and TheBlaze. AVOD services whose feeds are carried on Pluto include CBS News, CBS Sports HQ, Fox Sports, ET Live, Nosey, NBC News Now, Scripps News (short-form Scripps News Briefs are inserted into commercial breaks on other Pluto channels), Cheddar News, TYT Network, People TV and the religious-owned TBN (and its sister network Hillsong Channel), In addition, Pluto also offers “pop-up channels," which maintain binge-viewing or specialty programming formats that operate on a temporary or open-ended basis.

Availability

Pluto TV content can be streamed through a number of desktop, mobile and internet-connected TV platforms, including: Android and Apple iOS/iPadOS devices, Android TV, Apple TV, Amazon Fire TV, Roku, Cox Contour Stream Player, Vizio SmartCast, PlayStation 4, PlayStation 5, Xbox One, Xbox Series X/S, webOS, Chromecast, Virgin Media and macOS and Windows computers. Pluto-operated channels are also offered through The Roku Channel's live TV section.

In Canada, Pluto TV was available in a limited capacity due to existing program rights held by broadcasters. In June 2022, it was announced that Paramount would partner with Corus Entertainment to relaunch the service locally in late 2022, with Corus serving as ad-sale representative and providing library content to the service. Pluto TV was officially relaunched in Canada on December 1, 2022.

During the Canadian launch event on December 1, 2022, executive VP and international general manager Olivier Jollet told The Hollywood Reporter that they're already planned to launch Pluto TV in Australia by 2023 (by merging with Paramount's existing BVOD service 10Play) and are exploring expansion into other European territories.

See also 
 BET+ – co-owned subscription video-on-demand offshoot of BET, operated in conjunction with Tyler Perry Studios
 My5 – catchup service of Paramount Global's British TV network Channel 5, featuring Pluto-branded channels and content
 Nick+ – a subscription video-on-demand service offshoot of Nickelodeon
 Noggin – a subscription video-on-demand service specializing in preschool programming
 Paramount+ – a subscription video-on-demand service with content from the library of various Paramount Global divisions and subsidiaries
 Philo – a virtual cable TVex service jointly owned by Paramount Global, in conjunction with A&E Networks, AMC Networks, and Warner Bros. Discovery
 Showtime – a subscription video-on-demand offshoot of the premium television network of the same name
 Voot – an Indian subscription video-on-demand service featuring programming from various Viacom 18 networks along with some original programs

Notes and references

Notes

References

External links
 

2013 establishments in California
2019 mergers and acquisitions
American companies established in 2013
Android (operating system) software
Companies based in Berlin
Companies based in Los Angeles
Internet properties established in 2013
Internet television streaming services
IOS software
MacOS software
Paramount Streaming
PlayStation 4 software
Video on demand services
Windows software